was a Japanese journalist, Nichiren Buddhist priest, and politician who was Prime Minister of Japan for two months from 1956 to 1957, before resigning due to illness. He simultaneously served as Director General of the Japan Defense Agency. From 1952 to 1968 he was also the president of Rissho University. As a member of the Nichiren-shū sect of Nichiren Buddhism, Tanzan was his Buddhist name; his birth name was Seizō (省三).

Life
Ishibashi was born in the Shibanihonenoki district of Azabu ward, Tokyo in 1884, the eldest son of Sugita Tansei (1856–1931), a Nichiren Buddhist priest and the 81st head of Kuon-ji temple in Yamanashi prefecture. Ishibashi, who took on his mother's surname, would later become a Nichiren priest himself. He studied philosophy and graduated from Waseda University's literature department in 1907.

He worked as a journalist at the Mainichi Shimbun for a while. After he finished military service, he joined the staff of the Tōyō Keizai Shimpo ("Eastern Economic Journal"), later becoming its editor-in-chief and finally company president in 1941. For the Tōyō Keizai, Ishibashi wrote about Japanese financial policy, developing over time a new liberal perspective.

Ishibashi had a liberal political view and was one of the most consistent proponents of individualism during the Taishō Democracy movement. In this regard, he also promoted a feminist perspective, advocating comprehensive "legal, political, educational, and economic" equality for women so that they could better thrive in the competitive modern society, in contrast to the stratified conditions of feudal life. Ishibashi was also one of the rare personalities who opposed Japanese imperialism. Instead, he advocated a "Small Japan" policy (小日本主義, shō-Nihon-shugi), which advocated the abandonment of Manchuria and Japanese colonies to refocus efforts on Japan's own economic and cultural development. In addition, he allied himself with Tanaka Ōdō in arguing for free trade and international cooperation over militarism and colonialism.

After World War II Ishibashi received an offer from the Japan Socialist Party to run for the National Diet as their candidate. However, Ishibashi declined, and instead accepted a post of "advisor" to the newly formed Liberal Party. Ishibashi then served as Minister of Finance in Shigeru Yoshida's first cabinet from 1946 to 1947. Ishibashi was elected to the Diet for the first time in the April 1947 general election, representing Shizuoka's second district, but less than one month later he was purged and forced to resign for having openly opposed U.S. Occupation policies. Following his de-purging in 1951, Ishibashi allied with Ichirō Hatoyama and joined the movement against Yoshida's cabinet. In 1953, Hatoyama became prime minister, and Ishibashi was appointed Minister of Industry. Around this time, Ishibashi became known as a supporter of revising Article 9 of the Japanese Constitution and remilitarizing Japan. In 1955, the new Liberal Democratic Party (LDP) as a combination of smaller conservative parties, with Ishibashi as a founding member.

When Hatoyama retired in 1956, the LDP held a vote for their new president. At first Nobusuke Kishi was considered the most likely candidate, but Ishibashi allied himself with another candidate (Kojirō Ishii) and won the election, becoming the new Prime Minister of Japan. In the postwar period, a practice had developed whereby each prime minister would attempt to achieve a major foreign policy objective. Shigeru Yoshida had secured the peace treaty which ended the Occupation, Hatoyama had negotiated the resumption of diplomatic relations with the Soviet Union, and now Ishibashi stated that his main objective would be resuming diplomatic relations with the People's Republic of China. Ishibashi also signaled that he would endeavor to take a cooperative approach to the political opposition, resulting in high public approval ratings. Unfortunately he became sick and resigned only two months later, with Kishi taking over as prime minister.

Even after Ishibashi resigned the posts of prime minister and president of LDP, he remained a powerful faction boss and prominent figure among ex-Liberal Party politicians in the LDP. Ishibashi opposed Kishi's efforts to force through a revised version of the U.S.-Japan Security Treaty in 1960, which he felt were too extreme. When Kishi had opposition lawmakers physically removed from the Diet by police and rammed the new treaty through on May 19, 1960, Ishibashi was one of several LDP faction bosses who boycotted the vote in protest.

Ishibashi also remained a major figure in Japan's ongoing efforts to engage with the People's Republic of China, making a personal visit to China in 1963.

Tanzan Ishibashi died on April 24, 1973 

Waseda University later introduced the Waseda Journalism Award In Memory of Ishibashi Tanzan in 2001.

Honors
From the corresponding article in the Japanese Wikipedia

Grand Cordon of the Order of the Rising Sun (29 April 1964)
Grand Cordon of the Order of the Rising Sun with Paulownia Flowers (25 April 1973; posthumous)

References

Citations

Sources cited

Further reading
Liberalism in Modern Japan: Ishibashi Tanzan and His Teachers, 1905-1960, by Sharon H. Nolte, Published by University of California Press, 1986
Ishibashi Tanzan’s World Economic Theory - The War Resistance of an Economist in the 1930s, Princeton University (http://www.princeton.edu/~collcutt/doc/Keshi_English.pdf)

|-

|-

|-

|-

1884 births
1973 deaths
20th-century prime ministers of Japan
Prime Ministers of Japan
Japanese Buddhist clergy
Japanese journalists
Ministers of Finance of Japan
Ministers of Labour of Japan
Ministers of Health and Welfare of Japan
Japanese defense ministers
Members of the House of Representatives (Japan)
Nichiren-shū Buddhist monks
Waseda University alumni
People from Tokyo
People from Yamanashi Prefecture
Liberal Democratic Party (Japan) politicians
Social Democratic Party (Japan) politicians
20th-century Japanese politicians
20th-century journalists
Japanese Buddhists
Politicians from Tokyo
20th-century Buddhist monks